Li Hongta (born May 1949) is a retired Chinese politician who served as vice chairman of the Anhui Provincial Committee of the Chinese People's Political Consultative Conference from 2008 to 2013. He was a member of the 11th, and 12th National Committee of the Chinese People's Political Consultative Conference.

Biography
Li was born in Beijing, China in May 1949, to Li Baohua, former governor of the People's Bank of China, and Tian Yingxuan, former deputy director of Beijing Textile Bureau. His grandfather Li Dazhao was a communist revolutionary imprisoned by the Beiyang government for spreading Marxism and Communism in China and one of the founders of the Communist Party of China. He enlisted in the People's Liberation Army (PLA) in August 1965 and joined the Communist Party of China in April 1978. During the Cultural Revolution, he was a worker at the chlorination workshop of Hefei Chemical Plant. In September 1973, he was accepted to Hefei University of Technology, where he majored in the Department of Electrical Engineering. After graduating in September 1976, he continued to Hefei Chemical Plant as a technician.

He entered politics in 1978, when he was appointed deputy secretary of Hefei Municipal Committee of the Communist Youth League, two years later, he was promoted to secretary, and became a member of the standing committee of the Hefei Party committee, the city's top authority. In 1983, he was appointed deputy secretary of Anhui Provincial Committee of the Communist Youth League. In June 1987 he became the deputy head of Anhui Provincial Department of Civil Affairs, rising to head in the next year. On 30 January 2008, he was elected vice chairman of the Anhui Provincial Committee of the Chinese People's Political Consultative Conference.

Personal life
Li has a son named Li Rougang.

Awards
 2021 July 1 Medal

References

1949 births
Living people
People from Beijing
Hefei University of Technology alumni
People's Republic of China politicians from Hebei
Chinese Communist Party politicians from Hebei